Luzhanka is a village located in Bolhrad Raion, Odesa Oblast in southwestern Ukraine. It is also located in the historical region of Budjak in southern Bessarabia. Luzhanka belongs to Borodino settlement hromada, one of the hromadas of Ukraine.

History

Until 18 July 2020, Luzhanka belonged to Tarutyne Raion. The raion was abolished in July 2020 as part of the administrative reform of Ukraine, which reduced the number of raions of Odesa Oblast to seven. The area of Tarutyne Raion was merged into Bolhrad Raion.

Notable people
Serhiy Hrynevetsky (born 1957), politician, Governor of Odesa Oblast (1998–2005, 2020–2022)

References

Villages in Bolhrad Raion